Ultimatum is an American thrash metal band from Albuquerque, New Mexico.

History
Ultimatum was formed in 1992 in Albuquerque, New Mexico by Robert Gutierrez, John Carroll and Greg Dingess. Robert's former Angelic Force guitar player Steve Trujillo joined soon after. Vocalist Scott Waters joined the band in January 1993 and their first public performance together was at the Sonshine Festival in Albuquerque, NM in 1993.

From 1992-1995 the band performed regularly locally and recorded three demos, Fatal Delay (1993), Symphonic Extremities by Ultimatum (1994), and then Symphonic Extremities (1995). The later two demos were later combined and released on CD by indie label Juke Box Media and released on CD with a new song that was mixed by Whitecross guitarist Rex Carroll.

Drummer Sean Griego joined the band in 1995, whose more aggressive style helped the band morph from traditional heavy metal to a more aggressive speed and thrash metal style. That same year the band opened up for Mortification on their Blood World tour. Mortification bassist Steve Rowe liked the band's performance and purchased all their demo tapes to sell through his new indie distribution company, Rowe Productions. In 1996, the band was signed to a three-album contract with Rowe, releasing Puppet of Destruction in 1998, which was distributed by Diamante Music Group in the US.

Puppet of Destruction received mixed reviews. Within a year the band used the same line-up on their second album for Rowe Productions, Mechanics of Perilous Times. The album was scheduled to be released in early 2000 on Rowe. During this time, the band also released two songs for Dwell records, including a cover of Testament's "Sins of Omission". Due to the success of the Testament cover, Massacre Records approached Ultimatum about being on their label.  Rowe Productions allowed the band to release the album on their new label in March 2001.

Bassist Tom Micheals left Ultimatum in 2001 following the band's performance at the second Stryper Expo in Anaheim, CA. The band put up an ad on their website searching for a bassist and Rob Whitlock answered the advertisement and became their new bassist.

The band began recording demos again in 2004 to shop to record labels. They recorded a four-song demo that caught the attention of Retroactive Records who signed the band. In the meantime, the four song demo was released on CD with a couple of bonus tracks as the Til the End EP on Roxx Productions (2006). It was re-released in 2016 on Stone Groove Records.

In 2006 guitarist Steve Trujillo left the band and was replaced by Augustine Ortiz.Into the Pit was recorded with producer Ysidro Garcia at Sight 16 Studios. During the recording, longtime drummer Sean Griego was replaced by former Moshketeers drummer Alan Tuma. Alan recorded drums on four of the album's eleven tracks. Into the Pit was released by Retroactive Records on October 30, 2007 to positive reviews.Outburn Magazine, Issue No. 43, p. 43 

In 2007, Retroactive reissued Symphonic Extremities and Mechanics of Perilous Times, remastered and containing bonus tracks.

In 2008 Ultimatum recorded a covers album featuring songs that were at least partially chosen by fan suggestions on the band's discussion board. Lex Metalis was released on Retroactive Records on July 21, 2009.

In 2009, Puppet of Destruction was remastered and re-released on Roxx Records with bonus tracks. A limited edition run of 1000 copies were pressed as a two-CD set with the 1993 Fatal Delay demo on the bonus disc.

Their sound has been compared to Exodus and Metal Church. The singles "World of Sin" from their 1995 debut album Symphonic Extremities and "Never" from their second studio 1998 album Puppet of Destruction reached the top ten on the Pure Rock Report's chart. The band has continued to tour up to the present day.

Discography
'Demos'
 Fatal Delay (1993)
 Symphonic Extremities by Ultimatum (1994)
 Symphonic Extremities (1995)
 Never (1996)

'Studio albums'
 Symphonic Extremities (1995) - Juke Box Media
 Puppet of Destruction (1998) - Rowe Productions
 The Mechanics of Perilous Times... (2001) - Gutter Records, an imprint of Massacre Records
 Into the Pit (2007) - Retroactive Records
 Lex Metalis (2009) - Retroactive Records

'Compilations'
 Heart of Metal - 20 Years of Ultimatum (2012) - Roxx

'EPs
 Til' the End'' (2006) - Roxx

MembersCurrent line up Scott Waters – vocals (1993–present)
 Robert Gutierrez – guitar (1992–present)
 Rob Whitlock – bass (2002–present)
 Alan Tuma – drums (2007–present)Former members'''
 Steve Trujillo – guitar (1992–2006)
 Mike Lynch – drums (1993–1997)
 Greg Dingess – bass (1993–1995)
 Joey Anaya – bass (1994–1995)
 Tom Michaels – bass (1995–2002)
 Sean Griego – drums (1997–2006)
 Augustine Ortiz – guitar (2006)
 Justin Frear – guitar (2008; died 2020)
 Fabian Aguilar – guitar (2010–2011)

References

External links
 [ Ultimatum's page] on AllMusic

American Christian metal musical groups
American thrash metal musical groups
American speed metal musical groups
Heavy metal musical groups from New Mexico
Musical groups established in 1992
Rowe Productions artists